UMPS may refer to:

 University of Moral and Political Sciences, now Thammasat University, a public research university in Thailand
 Uridine monophosphate synthetase, an enzyme encoded by the UMPS gene